Edward Lansing (April 30, 1856 – September 9, 1920) was an American golfer. He competed in the men's individual event at the 1904 Summer Olympics.

References

External links
 

1856 births
1920 deaths
Amateur golfers
American male golfers
Olympic golfers of the United States
Golfers at the 1904 Summer Olympics
People from Marion County, Missouri
Sportspeople from Missouri